Papyrus Oxyrhynchus 152 (P. Oxy. 152 or P. Oxy. I 152) is a receipt, written in Greek and discovered in Oxyrhynchus. The manuscript was written on papyrus in the form of a sheet. The document was written on 1 March 618. Currently it is housed in the Egyptian Museum (10048) in Cairo.

Description 
The document is a receipt showing that Georgius, a secretary, had paid 10 and 5/8 carats to two men employed at the hippodrome on the side of the Blues (Βενέτων).

The measurements of the fragment are 84 by 345 mm.

It was discovered by Grenfell and Hunt in 1897 in Oxyrhynchus. The text was published by Grenfell and Hunt in 1898.

See also 
 Oxyrhynchus Papyri
 Papyrus Oxyrhynchus 151
 Papyrus Oxyrhynchus 153
 Chariot racing in the Byzantine era

References 

152
7th-century manuscripts
Byzantine manuscripts
Egyptian Museum